From the Sounds Inside is the first internet album by American musician John Frusciante. A digital-only album released exclusively through the internet in  August 2001, the album was free to download from his official website and includes material recorded during the To Record Only Water for Ten Days era of his solo career, most of which remained unmixed or unfinished. No track titles were given originally, which has given rise to songs appearing under different names in different sources.

Background
The album was named by fans through a contest in 2001. The album's title was a result of a voting among fans, where it won with 36%. Two other titles, "2001 Internet Album" and "Live Above Hell" received 35% and 29% of votes.

Alternate versions of tracks 1,5,11,15,16,19 appeared commercially on To Record Only Water for Ten Days, Going Inside EP and the soundtrack album to the film The Brown Bunny (2004). The remaining 15 tracks are exclusive to this release.

Track listing

References

External links 

John Frusciante albums
2001 albums